Łomazy  is a village in Biała Podlaska County, Lublin Voivodeship, in eastern Poland. It is the seat of the gmina (administrative district) called Gmina Łomazy.

The village has a population of 4,694.

History
Łomazy was first mentioned in a document written in 1447. It was conveniently located on the trade route from Kraków to Wilno. The settlement received city rights in 1568 from the Polish king Zygmunt August. After the foreign partitions of Poland in 1795 Łomazy was incorporated into the Austrian Partition first, than to the Russian Partition after the period of Polish insurrections against the foreign powers. The Russian tsar stripped Łomazy of its city rights in 1870 in retaliation for the successful Polish attack on the local Russian garrison during the January Uprising of 1863.

20th century
Following the First World War Łomazy became part of the Lublin Voivodeship (1919–39) in the reborn sovereign Second Polish Republic. The economic situation was very difficult resulting to sizable migration. Poverty and hunger contributed to the growing tensions between Christians and Jews split in half evenly by population numbers, which in turn led to a disturbance in May 1934 requiring police intervention. Jews settled in Łomazy already in mid-16th century.

During the invasion of Poland by Nazi Germany and the Soviet Union at the onset of World War II, Łomazy was taken over by the Red Army and passed on to the Germans in the Nazi-Soviet boundary treaty. A Jewish exploitation ghetto was created in Łomazy in early 1940. 

Two years later, the village was the site of a mass murder of all ghettoized Jews by the paramilitary Reserve Police Battalion 101 of the Nazi German Ordnungspolizei (Order Police) aided by the specially trained Ukrainian Hilfswillige known as Trawnikis. The killings took place on August 17 or 19, 1942 in the nearby Hały forest, but also in the homes during roundups. According to different sources some 1,000–2,000 Jews (1,700 according to German documents) were massacred in Łomazy in one day of killings which lasted until the late evening, there was only 1 documented survivor from the massacre. After the war, a group of Jews returned to excavate the bodies and provide proper burials, and a memorial was erected at the site commemorating the perished Jewish citizens of the town.

References

Villages in Biała Podlaska County
Brest Litovsk Voivodeship
Siedlce Governorate
Kholm Governorate
Lublin Voivodeship (1919–1939)
Holocaust locations in Poland